Lubieszewo Pierwsze  is a village in the administrative district of Gmina Nowy Dwór Gdański, within Nowy Dwór Gdański County, Pomeranian Voivodeship, in northern Poland.

The village has a population of 120.

References

Lubieszewo Pierwsze